Andy Hope 1930 (born Andreas Hofer) is a German artist.

Since 1998, most of his work has been signed "Andy Hope 1930" (although at that time the artist was still named Andreas Hofer).

Hope's subject matter encompasses superheroes, dinosaurs, devils, spaceships and historical villains. He sometimes paints over the top of already painted canvases, sometimes allowing parts of the earlier picture to remain visible.

Exhibitions 

Exhibitions include: 
 Viva Arte Viva, La Biennale di Venezia, 57th International Art Exhibition, Venice, Italy, 2017
 Andy Hope 1930: When Dinosaurs Become Modernists, Inverleith House, Edinburgh, Scotland, 2012–2013
 Robin Dostoyevsky by Andy Hope 1930, Contemporary Art Centre of Málaga, Spain, 2011
 Andy Hope 1930 at the Freud, Freud Museum, London, 2010
 Andy Hope 1930, Sammlung Goetz, Munich, Germany, 2009
 The Long Tomorrow, MARTa Herford, Herford, Germany, 2007
 Only Gods could survive, Metro Pictures, New York, USA, 2007
 Trans Time, Galerie Guido W. Baudach, Berlin, Germany, 2006
 Welt ohne Ende, Städtische Galerie im Lenbachhaus, Munich, Germany, 2005

References and notes

External links 
 Artist Website

1963 births
Living people
20th-century German painters
20th-century German male artists
German male painters
Artists from Munich